A Klabautermann is a water kobold that assists sailors and fishermen on the Baltic and North Sea in their duties. It is a merry and diligent creature, with an expert understanding of most watercraft, and an irrepressible musical talent. It is believed to rescue sailors washed overboard. The name comes from the Low German verb klabastern meaning "rumble" or "make a noise". An etymology deriving the name from the verb kalfatern ("to caulk") has also been suggested.

His image is of a small sailor in yellow with a tobacco pipe and woolen sailor's cap, often carrying a caulking hammer. This likeness is carved and attached to the mast as a symbol of good luck.

Despite the positive attributes, there is one omen associated with his presence: no member of a ship blessed by his presence shall ever set eyes on him. He only ever becomes visible to the crew of a doomed ship.

More recently, the Klabautermann is sometimes described as having more sinister attributes, and blamed for things that go wrong on the ship. This incarnation of the Klabautermann is more demon- or goblin-like, prone to play pranks and, eventually, doom the ship and her crew. This deterioration of the Klabautermann's image probably stems from sailors, upon returning home, telling stories of their adventures at sea. Since life at sea can be rather dull, all creatures - real, mythical, and in between - eventually became the centre of rather ghastly stories.

Klabautermann in fiction 
In "The Musician's Tale: The Ballad of the Carmilhan" in Tales of a Wayside Inn by Henry Wadsworth Longfellow, the "Klaboterman" appears to the crew of the doomed ship Valdemar, saving only the honest cabin boy.
In the manga and anime series One Piece, the pirate ship Going Merry, unknown by the crew, had its own Klabautermann. This Klabautermann fixed the boat when it was too damaged to go on, and spoke to Usopp, telling him not to worry because the boat would carry everyone a little longer. It was later revealed that the repairs the Klabauterman made were only temporary: the ship was too badly damaged to be permanently repaired, and sank shortly afterwards. This Klabautermann was portrayed in a manner strongly in line with the original, benevolent version of the creature (minus the pipe). He was ranked as the 49th most popular character in One Piece (with 46 votes), 2 votes more than the Going Merry itself.
Dschinghis Khan released a single in 1982 called "Klabautermann".
Pumuckl, a German TV (1980s) and radio (1960s) series Kobold, descends from the dynasty of the Klabautermänner.
In "Jeder stirbt für sich allein" (published in English as Every Man Dies Alone or "Alone in Berlin") by Hans Fallada, the author depicts the "resistance of the little people" to the Nazi regime. The novel shows the determined and sustained two-year campaign of Berlin residents Otto and Anna Quangel to protest against the government by the act of writing and distributing anti-Nazi postcards. This brave act, which begins when the couple lose their son in combat in France, eventually unleashes severe and disastrous consequences for many, not least for the main investigator assigned to the case, Kommissar Escherich of the Gestapo. In pursuit of the perpetrator for most of the novel, it is Escherich who nicknames the postcards' author "der Klabautermann".

References 
Melville, F The Book of Faeries 2002 Quarto Publishing

Kobolds
Superstitions
Baltic Sea
Maritime folklore
Fictional sailors